Fatih Kuruçuk (born 1 September 1998) is a Turkish professional footballer who plays as a defender for Turkish club Bandırmaspor.

Career
Kuruçuk is a youth product of Göztepe, and moved to Göztepe in 2017. Kuruçuk made his with Fatih Karagümrük in a 1-1 Süper Lig tie with Sivasspor on 21 November 2020. On 2 June 2020, he transferred to Hatayspor, signing a 2-year contract.

International career
Kuruçuk represented the Turkey U23s in their winning campaign at the 2021 Islamic Solidarity Games.

Honours
Turkey U23
Islamic Solidarity Games: 2021

References

External links

1998 births
People from Balçova
Living people
Turkish footballers
Turkey youth international footballers
Turkey under-21 international footballers
Association football defenders
Göztepe S.K. footballers
Fethiyespor footballers
Fatih Karagümrük S.K. footballers
Hatayspor footballers
Bandırmaspor footballers
Süper Lig players
TFF First League players
TFF Second League players